Killearn (Scottish Gaelic: Cill Fhearann, from orig. Ceann Fhearann, "Head/End of (the) Land/Territory" – until the 15th century when Ceann was replaced by Cill; denoting the presence of a house of worship) – is a small village of approximately 1700 people in the Stirling council area of Scotland.

The village has its own primary school, a local Co-Op Store, a pre and post school club - The Little Outdoor Classroom, and two nurseries - Mulberrybush Montessori and Heron House

The Glengoyne whisky distillery, Loch Lomond and the Trossachs National Park and West Highland Way long-distance walking route are situated close to the village.

The residential special school of Ballikinrain is also located in Killearn Parish, and caters for boys with special needs from throughout Scotland. (The school has been earmarked for closure in July 2015).

The Church of Scotland congregation at Killearn Kirk falls under the Presbytery of Stirling, within the Synod of Forth. Within the Roman Catholic Church, Killearn falls under the Parish of Saint Anthony within the Roman Catholic Archdiocese of Saint Andrews and Edinburgh; although the Catholic community in Killearn is served by St. Anthony's Church in the neighbouring town of Balfron.

George Buchanan
 

Killearn was the birthplace of the historian and humanist scholar George Buchanan, (February 1506 – 28 September 1582). Buchanan belonged to the Monarchomach movement, which advocated of a form of popular sovereignty. Born at The Moss, Killearn, a monument, (Obelisk), at the centre of the village is dedicated to Buchanan.

References

External links

Killearn on the Web
Killearn Community Council

Villages in Stirling (council area)